Folketing elections were held in Denmark on 16 November 1932, except in the Faroe Islands where they were held on 12 December. The Social Democratic Party remained the largest in the Folketing, with 62 of the 149 seats. Voter turnout was 81.5% in Denmark proper and 59.2% in the Faroes.

Results

References

Elections in Denmark
Denmark
Folketing
Denmark